Mons Tai is a mountain of the surface of the Moon.  Its name, given on March 4, 2019, comes from the mountain of Tai Shan, mountain in China's Shandong province just south of Beijing. Its diameter is 24 km. The name was given in connection with the Chang'e 4 mission, the lander of which has landed within this crater.

References

Mountains on the Moon